Club Sportivo Carapeguá, is a Paraguayan football club based in the city of Carapeguá in the Paraguarí Department. The club was founded on 3 September 2010 and plays in the División Intermedia.

The club played in the Paraguayan Primera División in 2012 and in 2013.

Their home games are played at the Estadio Teniente 1º Alcides González.

Current squad 2012 
As of January 30, 2012.

Honours
División Intermedia (0):
Runner-up (1): 2011

Primera División B Nacional (1):
Winner (1): 2022

Managers
 Miguel Ángel Zahzú (2012)

References

External links
 Albigol: Sportivo Carapeguá Info

Football clubs in Paraguay
Association football clubs established in 2010
2010 establishments in Paraguay